This is a list of Bien de Interés Cultural landmarks in the Province of Jaén, Spain.

 Arc of San Lorenzo
 Castillo de Alcaudete
 Castle of Aldehuela
 Giribaile Castle
 Palacio del Deán Ortega

References 

 
Jaen